Rosa (Roosje) Glaser (1914 - 2000) was a Dutch dancer and survivor of the Holocaust.

Biography 
Roosje Glaser was born in the city of Nijmegen, Netherlands, and grew up in the small town of Kleef in Germany. Before the Second World War Roosje was a dance teacher. She ran four dance schools. She was a Jewish young woman who was betrayed by her ex-husband during the war. She was transported to a total of 7 different concentration camps. First to the Dutch camps Westerbork and next to camp Herzogenbusch. She managed to escape, was re-captured and was punished by immediate transportation to Auschwitz. Roosje survived by teaching dance to the SS officers.

She was liberated by the Swedish Red Cross. After that she decided to stay in Sweden where she lived the remainder of her life. In 2013 her story was published in the book Dancing with the Enemy, in several theatres, as well as in exhibitions.

A young girl before the war 
When Roosje Glaser was a toddler, in the small town of Kleef in Germany, she saw people dance. She was fascinated by it and dancing became her passion. Roosje Glaser grew into an emancipated woman who defied conventions with flair. She became a very successful dance teacher, dancing in Amsterdam, London, Paris, Berlin and Brussels. She lost the love of her life in 1936, found consolation in the arms of another and married Leo Crielaars on May 7, 1937. When the Nazis occupied the Netherlands, it was the beginning of a very dangerous adventure for Roosje Glaser, 25 years old and Jewish. The danger became acute when her husband started to show Nazi sympathies. Their marriage ended in divorce.

In May 1940 The Netherlands are invaded by the Germans. Roosje Glaser, being Jewish, is soon affected by the first anti-Jewish measures. She finds these measures too much of an interference of her freedom of movement and decides not to obey the discriminatory rules, despite the threat of severe punishments for disobeying them. Every Dutch person with a Jewish background has to have a capital letter ‘J’ in their passports. Roosje removes the letter from her passport so that she can walk the streets and pass checkpoints at railway stations without any problems.

Sometimes she even likes to play a game: she sits in a café terrace with a sign over her head saying: ‘prohibited for Jews’, preferably next to a German and asking people to take a picture. Since she had grown up in Germany and was educated at German elementary schools, her German is fluent.

She starts four dance schools and they become successful. Her success is further enhanced by publicity because she introduces dances from abroad, especially from Paris, London and Brussels where she has joined various dance associations. Her picture appears in a number of magazines. Roosje Glaser also gets in touch with the Dutch cinema news. This results in her being seen in all the Dutch cinemas.

Dancing and betrayal 
In 1941 Roosje Glaser's husband Leo reports her Jewish identity to the ‘Kulturkammer’. She is forced to close her thriving dance schools immediately. Roosje Glaser's passion, however, does not allow her to become inactive. Illegally, she continues the dance school in the attic of her house. Suddenly betrayal comes again. In the spring of 1942, Leo Crielaars and his brother Marinus Crielaars betray Roosje to the commissioner of police and the mayor, for not wearing a star of David on her clothes. She is arrested and handed over to the SS. After six weeks in jail she is set free again.

Towards the end of the dance season Roosje Glaser wants to organize an end-of-season ball. However, due to Leo's and Marinus’ betrayal, everybody in town knows she is Jewish and Jews are not allowed to hire a ballroom. Doing nothing is not her style so she organizes an alternative end-of-season ball. She meets her students at the railway station in the morning and they cycle into the countryside where they dance and have fun in a remote recreation area with a wood-built cafeteria.

Shortly after this final ball, she is given orders to report to a Dutch concentration camp voluntarily but she refuses. She changes her identity by stealing a passport from one of her non-Jewish students and sticks her own picture in it. Since people know her in her own town she decides to move to another town. She gets an address from her former lover Kees and for a while, using her new identity, she lives in a boarding house run by a Dutchman who is a member of the Nazi party and is married to a German woman. All of a sudden Kees betrays her for money and tries to steal the cash she has set aside to pay for room and board. Then disaster hits. She is arrested at gunpoint by a Dutch policeman and a frightening time in concentration camps begins.

Concentration camps 
The first concentration camp Roosje Glaser is sent to is Westerbork. After that six more camps follow.

The Netherlands

Westerbork 14/10/1942 – 20/02/1943

Herzogenbusch 20/02/1943 – 10/09/1943

Poland

Auschwitz-Birkenau 19/09/1943 – 18/01/1945

Death march 18/01/1945 – 22/01/1945

Germany

Ravensbruck 22/01/1945- 15/02/1945

Berlin preparing defence works 15/02/1945 – 23/03/1945

Bergen Belsen 23/03/1945 – 29/03/1945

Neuengamme, department Wansbeck 29/03/1945 – 30/03/1945

Despite the terrible living conditions in the camps, Roosje Glaser tries to remain in charge of her life as much as she can by organizing cabarets and dances. She also writes songs. She manages to escape from Herzogenbusch Concentration Camp but is caught again and as a punishment she is sent to Auschwitz immediately. Roosje Glaser survives by teaching dance to the SS

In Auschwitz she is imprisoned in the building for medical experiments. She is sterilized and when she refuses to undergo more invading experiments she is punished by being sent to work with the Sonderkommando at the gas chambers. After six weeks of this exhausting and terrifying work, she finds her cousin among the many dead bodies. Her strength disappears and desperate but courageous as she is, she manages to get another job in a grenade factory nearby. Her passion for dance improves her situation. In Auschwitz she teaches dance and etiquette to SS officers. She loses everything except her courage and she remains faithful to her character.

Shortly after her liberation Roosje Glaser writes a letter about the bombings she experienced in Auschwitz: "The most horrendous air raids on Auschwitz, `Breslau, Berlin, and Hamburg left me completely indifferent. After a while I didn't even bother getting up, whether I was in a wooden barrack, the back of a truck or in the open air. While the shrapnel whizzed past our ears we told each other jokes. Why worry about the future? You had to enjoy life in the present, No, life in Germany made me hard and cruel."

Liberation dance 
Relief organisations such as the Swedish, Belgian and French Red Cross are active in Germany towards the end of the war but the Dutch Red Cross is conspicuously absent. Roosje Glaser has to pretend she is Danish in order to get some help. She survives on the food parcels from the Swedish Red Cross.

In 1945 Folke Bernadotte, chairman of the Swedish Red Cross made a deal with Himmler for a rescue operation of prisoners of the concentration camps.  Roosje Glaser is exchanged for three German prisoners of war and then the Swedish Red Cross take her to a refugee camp in Sweden. She weighs 35 kilos but recovers fast. In the refugee camp she organizes cabaret and dance activities. She also shows a new dance; the Bolero. Roosje Glaser calls this her Liberation Dance.

When the Dutch Embassy in Sweden urges the Dutch to return to the Netherlands as soon as they feel healthy enough, Roosje wonders if she still sees the Netherlands as her fatherland. She remembers how she was betrayed by her own husband Leo, by his brother Marinus, by Kees. All of them Dutchmen. Dutch policemen arrested her, Dutch investigators interrogated her, Dutch employees of the Kulturkammer destroyed her successful dance schools, Dutch people guarded her in prison, Dutch people took her to the camps. None of them were German. So why should she go back to Holland? On top of that she realizes that as far as her family is concerned there was no need to go there either. She had worked at the gas chambers and other terrible placed. She had seen what had happened and she had become convinced that it made no sense to go back there since there would be no family left to see. Roosje Glaser decides to stay in Sweden. Holland is no longer her home. She builds a new future in Sweden. A future with memories.

She conceals her tattooed Auschwitz number from others. She goes out dancing and makes new friends and on 15 February 1946 she marries The Swedish Elon Nordström. She manages to preserve her joie de vivre, her passion for dance and music, her positive interest in people and her optimism, despite the terrible things she has had to endure. “From the beginning of my life here in Sweden I always signed my letters Roosje as I used to do, but there is a difference. In the R of Roosje and my official name Rosita, I draw a smiley, a grinning face laughing at life. A snub to those who wanted to intimidate me, to break me. They never succeeded.”

In 2000, Roosje died in Stockholm, aged 85.

After the war 
After the war it gradually transpires how many prisoners were killed. Of the twelve hundred people on the train that transported Roosje Glaser from the Netherlands to Auschwitz, seven hundred were gassed on arrival and five hundred were put to work. According to the reports only eight of the original twelve hundred survived. 90% of Roosje Glaser's family was murdered. The percentage of Dutch Jews murdered in the camps was higher than in any of its neighbouring countries, including Germany.
Roosje Glaser wrote a long letter to the Dutch government from Sweden. She accused Leo, Marinus and Kees of betrayal. Leo Crielaars was arrested and imprisoned in camp Vught, which was empty at the time and provided a useful prison facility. After an investigation, Leo was found guilty of treason. After serving nine months, Leo was released and was free to continue with his dance school. He died in 1978.

As a result of the information Roosje Glaser had provided, Marinus Crielaars was arrested and imprisoned as well. In addition of his betrayal of Roosje, it transpired that Marius had committed other crimes as well. The judge sentenced him to ten years in prison. The sentence was halved a year later.

These post-war legal processes were launched under the slogan “swift, sever and just”, but due to the enormity of this process, the process of Dutch reconstruction and the military actions in Indonesia, swiftness was quickly prioritized over severity and justice.

Kees was also arrested but not only as a result of Roosje's testimony. In addition to treason, Kees was also suspected of fraud and collaboration. When he was taken prisoner by the Allies in Dessau he was in possession of a large sum of money. He was handed over to the Dutch authorities and he too was imprisoned in camp Vught. His interrogation produced a substantial file. Several witnesses characterized him as extremely unreliable. One report mentioned the German execution of a resistance fighter and a crashed English pilot, based on information provided by Kees. In spite of the fact that Kees had persecuted people and had dressed in an SS uniform, the judge found there was insufficient evidence for a conviction. At the request of the defending lawyer a psychiatrist declared that Kees was not entirely sane. He was released and he moved to Germany. Kees died in Cologne in 1996.

A year later, Roosje Glaser wrote in one of her photo albums about her relationship with Leo and Kees: “I met my second misfortune in 1937, namely Kees. Leo and I rented our dance hall from him in Den Bosch. This man is responsible for the entire unfortunate situation that has followed me like a shadow for ten long years. I fell in love with him and he with me. A dangerous game developed involving money, ethics and honour. Everyone lost.  All three of us lost love, money and our good reputations. Hate, in the most profound sense, left deep wounds. It was an unforgettable three-sided affair. Now we are all married. I think I am the one who is best off. I want to forget him as one forgets a nightmare. Maturity has helped me succeed”.

Roosje Glaser survived both Leo and Kees. In 1947 she visits the Netherlands for the first time since the war. She visits her friends and the former students of her dance school. Her home in the city of Den Bosch where her illegal dance school used to be was destroyed when the British RAF bombed the city in an attempt to liberate it. Shortly before she had to flee in 1942, Roosje Glaser had buried her photo albums and films. She digs them up and takes them back to Sweden.

To Roosje Glaser a person's character was what counted. That was most important to her: character, character, character. The preface to her diary, that she began to write in the SS prison in Den Bosch says: ‘Difficulties and risks are the judge of our character’.

See also 
 Anne Frank
 Etty Hillesum
 Edith Eger

References

External links 
       Roosje Glaser Foundation https://www.roosjefoundation.org (in English, German, Dutch)
       RandomhousePenguin  https://www.dancingwiththeenemy.net (in English)   
       Introduction into the story https://vimeo.com/315248842 (in Dutch, English subtitles)

Dutch Jews
Dutch dancers
1914 births
2000 deaths